Miroslav Král (born 16 September 1986, in Brno) is a Czech football player who currently plays for FC Zbrojovka Brno. Miroslav plays the defensive position.

References

External links
 
 Profile at FC Zbrojovka Brno official site

1986 births
Living people
Czech footballers
Czech First League players
FC Zbrojovka Brno players
Footballers from Brno
Association football defenders
SK Líšeň players
Fotbal Fulnek players